"La Nena de Argentina" (English: "The girl from Argentina"; stylised in all caps) is a song by Argentine singer-songwriter María Becerra. It was written by Becerra and Nico Cotton and produced by the latter. The song was released on 8 December 2022 as the third single from her second studio album of the same name.

Background
"La Nena de Argentina" was revealed days prior to its released through Becerra’s social media accounts, where the song appeared as the final song on the track list.

Becerra on the name "La Nena de Argentina": “It represents many important things for me, above all, the representation of my country and that is what fulfills me the most. […] Suddenly I see posts like ‘how nice what our girl from Argentina is achieving’. People identify me as a part of the country, I think that is very nice, it is a very beautiful representation. I carry that flag with great pride and much respect. “"La Nena De Argentina" is my artistic personality and it defines me because I love my country and I want everyone to know that I’m Argentinian”.

Commercial performance

In Argentina, the song debuted at number 24 on the Billboard Argentina Hot 100 during the tracking week of 17 December 2022. On the week of 21 January 2023, during its sixth week, the song climbed one spot to a new peak at number 23.

Music video

The music video for "La Nena de Argentina" was directed by Julián Levy and was released simultaneously with the song. 

The video is a direct continuation and culmination for each visualizer that the album had for each track when released.

Charts

References

2022 singles
2022 songs
María Becerra songs
Spanish-language songs